Linthicum is a census-designated place (CDP) and unincorporated community in Anne Arundel County, Maryland, United States. The population was 10,324 at the 2010 census. It is located directly north of Baltimore–Washington International Thurgood Marshall Airport (BWI).

Designated as "Linthicum Heights" and zip code 21090 by the U.S. Postal Service, Linthicum has been traditionally divided into two distinct communities each with its own community association and identity. These two communities, split by the Baltimore Beltway in 1957, are Linthicum and North Linthicum (or, alternatively, Linthicum-Shipley and North Linthicum.) Both communities developed as a result of their locations adjacent to the Baltimore and Annapolis Short Line railroad which brought commuters to the original truck farming community.

As a developed community, Linthicum began with the 1908 founding of the "Linthicum Heights Company", though a "Linthicum" or "Linthicum's" station on the 1887 Annapolis and Baltimore Short Line railroad existed at least as early as 1889. The community's name was from the area's primary land-owning family since an 1801 purchase by Abner Linthicum.

The Linthicum Heights Historic District was listed on the National Register of Historic Places in 2006.

Geography
Linthicum is located at  (39.203876, −76.660506) in northern Anne Arundel County. It extends from the Patapsco River in the north (the Baltimore County line) to Maryland Route 170 (Aviation Boulevard) in the south, and from Interstate 195 in the west to Maryland Route 648 (Baltimore Annapolis Boulevard) in the east. It is bordered by the CDPs of Baltimore Highlands to the north (in Baltimore County), Brooklyn Park to the east, and Ferndale to the southeast, and by the Baltimore–Washington International Airport to the south.

The BWI Business District West Nursery area is located in Linthicum along the West Nursery Road corridor. The business district is home to numerous companies, offices, and commercial services.

Two major highways run through the CDP. The Baltimore Beltway (Interstate 695) runs northwest–southeast through Linthicum and intersects with the Baltimore–Washington Parkway (Maryland Route 295), which runs northeast-southwest.

Demographics

As of the census of 2000, there were 7,539 people, 2,877 households, and 2,206 families residing in the CDP. The racial makeup of the CDP was 94.39% White, 1.76% African American, 0.24% Native American, 2.44% Asian, 0.15% Pacific Islander, 0.23% from other races, and 0.80% from two or more races. Hispanic or Latino of any race were 0.89% of the population.

There were 2,877 households, out of which 28.3% had children under the age of 18 living with them, 64.3% were married couples living together, 8.7% had a female householder with no husband present, and 23.3% were non-families. 19.5% of all households were made up of individuals, and 10.5% had someone living alone who was 65 years of age or older. The average household size was 2.61 and the average family size was 2.98.

In the CDP, the population was spread out, with 21.3% under the age of 18, 6.2% from 18 to 24, 25.5% from 25 to 44, 26.4% from 45 to 64, and 20.6% who were 65 years of age or older. The median age was 43 years. For every 100 females, there were 93.0 males. For every 100 females age 18 and over, there were 91.7 males.

The median income for a household in the CDP was $61,479, and the median income for a family was $72,821. Males had a median income of $46,586 versus $35,104 for females. The per capita income for the CDP was $27,559. About 2.0% of families and 3.6% of the population were below the poverty line, including 3.1% of those under age 18 and 7.8% of those age 65 or over.

Economy
Ciena and Northrop Grumman Electronic Systems are among the companies based in Linthicum.

Public transportation

Linthicum is served by buses and three stops on the Baltimore Light Rail:
Nursery Road, 6825 Baltimore-Annapolis Boulevard
North Linthicum, 450 N. Camp Meade Road, Linthicum Heights
Linthicum, 308 S. Camp Meade Road, Linthicum Heights
From 1887 to February 1950, Linthicum was served by the now-defunct Baltimore and Annapolis Railroad's line between Baltimore and Annapolis, Maryland.

North Linthicum
The community of North Linthicum is defined by the North Linthicum Improvement Association as the area bounded by the Patapsco River from the Baltimore Beltway (I-695) to Old Annapolis Road (MD 648), Old Annapolis Road from the Patapsco River to the Baltimore Beltway, the Baltimore Beltway  from Old Annapolis Road to the Baltimore–Washington Parkway, the Baltimore–Washington Parkway from the Baltimore Beltway to Hammonds Ferry Road, and Hammonds Ferry Road from the Baltimore–Washington Parkway to the Patapsco River.

Adjacent towns
Glen Burnie
Baltimore
Hanover
Elkridge

Points of interest

National Electronics Museum
William P. Didusch Center for Urologic History
Benson-Hammond House
Friendship Church of the Brethren
Overlook Elementary School
Linthicum Elementary School
Lindale Middle School
St. Philip Neri School
Hutman Artistic "Environment", a library and car art studio
The Performing Arts Association of Linthicum
Holy Cross Antiochian Orthodox Church

Notable people

 Rafael Alvarez (born 1958), journalist, author, television writer
 Helen Delich Bentley (1923–2017), U.S. congresswoman (1985–1995)
 Pamela Beidle (born 1958, date questionable), Member, Maryland State Senate (District 32) and Maryland House of Delegates (District 32)
 Diane Lynn Warren Black (born 1951), U.S. congresswoman (2011–2019), Tennessee General Assembly (1998–2010)
 Michael W. Burns (born 1958), Maryland House of Delegates member (1994–1998), administrative law judge and attorney
 Robert A. Costa (born 1958), Maryland House of Delegates member since 2003
 John C. Inglis (born 1954), National Security Agency Deputy Director (2006–2014)
 John Charles Linthicum (1867–1932), U.S. congressman (1911–1932)
 G. E. Lowman (1897–1965), national radio evangelist
 Dorothy Mays (born 1957), Playboy July 1979 Playmate of the Month
 Brian Knighton aka Axl Rotten was found dead in a McDonald's restroom near a motel in Linthicum in 2016.
 Donald E. Murphy (born 1960), Maryland House of Delegates member (1995–2003)
 Bernard H. Paul (1907–2005), puppeteer
 Leonard T. "Max" Schroeder, Jr. (1918–2009), U.S. Army colonel
 Jim Spencer (1947–2002), Major League Baseball player (1968–1982, 1973); Major League Baseball All-Star Game

References

External links

Linthicum-Shipley Improvement Association
 North Linthicum Improvement Association
"Where We Live: A Small Town Few Want to Leave", The Washington Post, July 11, 2009
 

 
Census-designated places in Maryland
Census-designated places in Anne Arundel County, Maryland